Lopatin (from lopata meaning spade) is a Russian male surname. Its feminine counterpart is Lopatina. It may refer to 
 Aleksei Lopatin (born 1985), Russian association football player
 Anton Lopatin (1897–1965), Soviet military officer during World War II
 Asher Lopatin (born 1964), American rabbi
 Daniel Lopatin (born 25 July 1982), known professionally as Oneohtrix Point Never
 German Lopatin (1845–1918), Russian revolutionary
 Leo Mikhailovich Lopatin (1855–1920), Russian philosopher
Sergey Lopatin (disambiguation)
Vladimir Lopatin (born 1931), Soviet Olympic swimmer
 Yevgeny Lopatin (1917–2011), Soviet weightlifter
Ekaterina Mikhailovna Lopatina (1865–1935), Russian writer
Viktoria Lopatina (born 1981), Belarusian cross-country skier 

Russian-language surnames